Robert Francis "Red" Kinsella (January 5, 1899 – December 30, 1951) was an outfielder in Major League Baseball. He played for the New York Giants.

References

External links

1899 births
1951 deaths
Major League Baseball outfielders
New York Giants (NL) players
Baseball players from Illinois
Sportspeople from Springfield, Illinois
Bloomington Bloomers players
Galveston Sand Crabs players
Indianapolis Indians players
Lincoln Links players
Little Rock Travelers players
Newark Bears (IL) players
Pueblo Steelworkers players
Rochester Hustlers players
Salt Lake City Bees players
Springfield Senators players
Syracuse Stars (minor league baseball) players
Toledo Mud Hens players
Waterbury Brasscos players